Alfred Hans Rzeppa (January 23, 1885, Gliwice – January 1965) was an American engineer of Silesian descent working at Ford Motor Company who invented a version of constant-velocity joint in 1926. He proposed an improved design in 1936.

Rzeppa's design uses six balls and an inner and outer race to provide almost constant velocity torque transfer regardless of the joint angle. The joint works in a similar manner to a bevel gear with the balls bisecting the joint angle and functioning as the "teeth" to transmit torque.

The description of the two versions of the Rzeppa joint can be found in the US patents 2,010,899 and 2,046,584.

External links
 US Patent 2,010,899
 US Patent 2,046,584

1885 births
1965 deaths
20th-century American engineers